Diuris lanceolata, commonly known as large golden moths, is a species of orchid that is endemic to Tasmania. It has between two and four leaves and up to three golden to orange-yellow flowers with a few dark streaks.

Description
Flowering occurs from November to February.

Taxonomy and naming
Diuris lanceolata was first formally described by John Lindley in his 1840 book The Genera and Species of Orchidaceous Plants. The specific epithet (lanceolata) is a Latin word meaning "spear-like".

Distribution and habitat
Large golden moths is currently only known from one location on the north coast and one on the west coast of Tasmania, growing in wet grassland, in heath and in coastal scrub.

Conservation
Diuris lanceolata is classified as "endangered" under the Australian government Environment Protection and Biodiversity Conservation Act 1999 and the Tasmanian government Threatened Species Protection Act 1995.

References

lanceolata
Endemic orchids of Australia
Orchids of Western Australia
Endemic flora of Western Australia
Plants described in 1840